Takapsestis is a genus of moths belonging to the subfamily Thyatirinae of the Drepanidae. It was erected by Shōnen Matsumura in 1933.

Species
subgenus Neogaurena Roepke, 1944
Takapsestis semiobsoleta (Warren, 1915)
subgenus Neotakatogaria László , G. Ronkay & L. Ronkay, 2001
Takapsestis curvicosta (Warren, 1915)
subgenus Takapsestis
Takapsestis bifasciata (Hampson, 1895)
Takapsestis fascinata Yoshimoto, 1990
Takapsestis orbicularis (Moore, 1888)
Takapsestis wilemaniella Matsumura, 1933

References

 , 1933, Insecta Matsumurana 7: 199–200.
 , 2001, Acta Zoologica Academiae Scientiarum Hungaricae 47 (1): 27-85
 , 2007, Esperiana Buchreihe zur Entomologie Band 13: 1-683 
  1990: Takapsestis fascinata sp. n. from China (Lepidoptera, Thyatiridae). Nota lepidopterologica, 13 (4): 236–241. full article (pdf)

Thyatirinae
Drepanidae genera